"I Think I Can Beat Mike Tyson" is the first single taken from DJ Jazzy Jeff & The Fresh Prince's third studio album, And in This Corner…. The song was released as a single in late 1989. This is the duo's first single to be available on Compact Disc format. It peaked at number 58 on the Billboard Hot 100.

Music video
A music video (directed by Scott Kalvert) was released in 1989, which included guest-starring Chris Rock, and guest appearances by Mike Tyson, as well as his promoter Don King, and co-manager John Horne.

Track listing
 CD Single
 "I Think I Can Beat Mike Tyson" (Radio Mix) - 3:57
 "I Think I Can Beat Mike Tyson" (LP Version) - 4:50
 "I Think I Can Beat Mike Tyson" (Extended Mix) - 6:34

 12" Vinyl
 "I Think I Can Beat Mike Tyson" (Radio Mix) - 3:57
 "I Think I Can Beat Mike Tyson" (LP Version) - 4:50
 "I Think I Can Beat Mike Tyson" (Extended Mix) - 6:34

Charts

References

External links

Songs about boxers
1989 singles
DJ Jazzy Jeff & The Fresh Prince songs
Songs written by Will Smith
Songs written by DJ Jazzy Jeff
Comedy rap songs
Novelty songs
1989 songs
Jive Records singles
Cultural depictions of Mike Tyson